This is a list of 59 genera in the tribe Lepturini.

Lepturini genera

 Acmaeops LeConte, 1850
 Acmaeopsoides Linsley and Chemsak, 1976
 Alosternida Podany, 1961
 Analeptura Linsley & Chemsak, 1976
 Anastrangalia Casey, 1924
 Anoplodera 
 Anthophylax LeConte, 1850
 Bellamira LeConte, 1873
 Brachyleptura Casey, 1913
 Brachysomida Casey, 1913
 Centrodera LeConte, 1850
 Charisalia Casey, 1913
 Choriolaus Bates, 1885
 Comacmaeops Linsley and Chemsak, 1972
 Cortodera Mulsant, 1864
 Cosmosalia Casey, 1913
 Cyphonotida Casey, 1913
 Dorcasina Casey, 1913
 Encyclops Newman, 1838
 Evodinus LeConte, 1850
 Gaurotes LeConte, 1850
 Gnathacmaeops Linsley and Chemsak, 1972
 Grammoptera Audinet-Serville, 1835
 Idiopidonia Swaine & Hopping, 1928
 Judolia Mulsant, 1863
 Leptalia LeConte, 1873
 Leptorhabdium Kraatz, 1879
 Leptura Linnaeus, 1758
 Lepturobosca 
 Lepturopsis Linsley & Chemsak, 1976
 Lycochoriolaus Linsley & Chemsak, 1976
 Megachoriolaus Linsley, 1970
 Metacmaeops Linsley and Chemsak, 1972
 Neanthophylax Linsley and Chemsak, 1972
 Neoalosterna Podany, 1961
 Neobellamira Swaine & Hopping, 1928
 Orthochoriolaus Linsley & Chemsak, 1976
 Ortholeptura Casey, 1913
 Pachyta Dejean, 1821
 Pidonia Mulsant, 1863
 Piodes LeConte, 1850
 Pseudogaurotina Plaviltstshikov, 1958
 Pseudostrangalia Swaine & Hopping, 1928
 Pygoleptura Linsley & Chemsak, 1976
 Pyrotrichus LeConte, 1862
 Rhagium Fabricius, 1775
 Sachalinobia Jacobson, 1899
 Stenelytrana Gistl, 1848
 Stenocorus Fabricius, 1775
 Stenostrophia Casey, 1913
 Stictoleptura Casey, 1924
 Strangalepta Casey, 1913
 Strangalia Audinet-Serville, 1835
 Strophiona Casey, 1913
 Trachysida Casey, 1913
 Trigonarthris Haldeman, 1847
 Typocerus LeConte, 1850
 Xestoleptura Casey, 1913
 Xylosteus Frivaldszky, 1838

References